Yusef Abad (also transliterated as Yousef Abad, Yusuf Abad, Yusof Abad, Yousuf Abad, Persian: یوسف آباد , Hebrew: יוסף אבאד) is an old neighborhood of Tehran, consisting of an area developed through nearly parallel streets including; Sayed Jamaleddin Asad Abadi (usually considered to be the main street of Yusef Abad area), Ibn-e-sina (Avicena or Poor Sina), Jahan Ara, Mahram (Modabber), and Akbari (Mostowfi). The latter is the most beautiful, and seemingly the most expensive part of it. The area was first built by Mirza Yusef Ashtiani Mostowfi ul-Mamalek (Persian: میرزا یوسف آشتیانی مستوفی الممالک) in north-west of Dar-ol Xelafe Naseri, so was named after his name as Yusef Abad locality.

People residing there are, generally expected to be, of upper middle class, well-off, and prestigious. The area is located in the north-central part of the city and is served by Valiasr Street, as well as Kordestan and Hemmat Expressways.

Three parks are, commonly supposed to be, the most reputable recreation centers in the region; Shafaq park (Persian: پارک شفق), almost in the middle of the area, wherein Shafaq public library, and the well-known Shafaq or Student Community/Cultural Center (Persian: فرهنگسرای دانشجو یا شفق) are located. Second one is Qezel-Qale (translated as Red Castle) park, which is located at the beginning of Jahan Ara street. This place used to be a part of the former Qezel-Qale prison that has been abandoned for many years. The latter is Dustan (translated as Friends) park, that is situated on the northern part of Yusef Abad.

Yusef Abad has a gas station, Yusef Abad Gas Station, and a cinema/theater, Golriz Cinema-Theater. The famous Yusef Abad Police Station (Persian: کلانتری یوسف آباد) is located on the corner of Asad Abadi Square (formerly known as Kalantari Square, translated as Police Station Square, Persian: میدان کلانتری).

The locality is one of the major neighborhoods in Tehran with the highest population of Persian Jewish people. Others are Oudlajan, Gisha, Sheikh Hadi, and Gorgan.

Yusef Abad is host to a few synagogues, also one of the largest in north of the city, named Yusef Abad Synagogue (Persian: کنیسه یوسف آباد ,  Hebrew: בית הכנסת יוסף-אבד).

The area is home to some of the first and prominent residential skyscrapers in Tehran, the A.S.P. Towers. The towers are located on the corner of Kordestan and Hakim Highways. These well-built constructions were completed in 1976, and have been landmarks ever since.

Tehran International Tower (Persian: برج بین المللی تهران) is also situated just behind the A.S.P. Towers. This skyscraper has title of the tallest residential tower in Iran.

References 

Neighbourhoods in Tehran